Japan participated in the 1970 Asian Games held in Bangkok, Thailand from August 24, 1970 to September 4, 1970.
This country was ranked 1st with 74 gold, 47 silver and 23 bronze medals, making a total of 144 medals in all.

References

Nations at the 1970 Asian Games
1970
Asian Games